Eugen Mack (21 September 1907 – 29 October 1978) was a Swiss gymnast and Olympic Champion. He competed at the 1928 and 1936 Summer Olympics, winning a total of two Olympic gold medals, four silver medals and two bronze medals.

Although Eugen Mack never won the most coveted individual medal in the sport, that of Olympic All-Around Gold, he did become World All-Around Champion, and with 15 individual medals at the World Championships and Olympics, more than any other gymnast - male or female - in the pre-WWII era and pre-1952 era, he is arguably the most decorated gymnast during this long era.

References

External links

1907 births
1978 deaths
Swiss male artistic gymnasts
Gymnasts at the 1928 Summer Olympics
Gymnasts at the 1936 Summer Olympics
Olympic gymnasts of Switzerland
Olympic gold medalists for Switzerland
Olympic silver medalists for Switzerland
Olympic bronze medalists for Switzerland
Olympic medalists in gymnastics
Medalists at the 1936 Summer Olympics
Medalists at the 1928 Summer Olympics
20th-century Swiss people